María Mercedes Corral Aguilar (born 24 September 1947) is a Mexican politician from the National Action Party. From 2006 to 2009 she served as Deputy of the LX Legislature of the Mexican Congress representing Sonora, and previously served in the LVII Legislatur of the Congress of Sonora.

References

1947 births
Living people
Politicians from Sonora
Women members of the Chamber of Deputies (Mexico)
National Action Party (Mexico) politicians
21st-century Mexican politicians
21st-century Mexican women politicians
Academic staff of Universidad de Sonora
Universidad de Sonora alumni
Members of the Congress of Sonora
Deputies of the LX Legislature of Mexico
Members of the Chamber of Deputies (Mexico) for Sonora